Karri Kivi (born 31 January 1970, in Turku) is Finnish former ice hockey player and current coach. He is currently serving as head coach of Finnish team Porin Ässät.

Playing career 
He started his professional career in Ilves in 1988-89 and played until 2001, representing also TPS, Ässät and Kärpät in the SM-liiga. His playing career also included one season in Sweden with AIK. He was drafted by the NHL's Vancouver Canucks in 1990 in the 12th round, 223rd overall, though he ultimately would never play with the club. His career highlights included reaching the Liiga finals with Ilves in 1990 and earning promotion to Finland's top-tier with Kärpät in 2000.

Coaching career 
After his playing career, Kivi started his coaching career as an assistant coach at Liiga club Ässät. In 2011, he was promoted to the head coaching job and led Ässät to the Finnish championship in 2013, while receiving Coach of the Year honors. After this successful season, he joined the coaching staff of the Finnish ice hockey federation and coached Finland's men's national junior ice hockey team to the title at the World Junior Championship in 2014.

Prior to the 2014-15 season, Kivi accepted the job as head coach of Traktor Chelyabinsk of the Kontinental Hockey League (KHL). He was relieved of his duties in October 2014. Kivi was named head coach of Finnish Liiga side Ilves prior to the 2016-17 campaign. Kivi was signed as head coach for Ässät in the middle of the 2021–22 season.
2002–2006  Ässät Pori - assistant coach
2006–2007  Forssan Palloseura - head coach
2007–2009  Ässät Pori U20 - head coach
2009–2010  Ässät Pori - assistant coach
2011–2013  Ässät Pori - head coach
2014–2015  Traktor Chelyabinsk - head coach
2016–2020  Ilves Tampere - head coach
2021–present  Ässät Pori - head coach

Career statistics

References

External links

1970 births
AIK IF players
Ässät players
Finnish ice hockey coaches
Finnish ice hockey players
Kiekko-Vantaa players
Ilves players
Living people
Oulun Kärpät players
HC TPS players
Vancouver Canucks draft picks
Sportspeople from Turku
Ässät coaches